Barley yellow striate mosaic cytorhabdovirus (BYSMV) is a plant pathogenic virus of the family Rhabdoviridae.

External links
ICTVdB - The Universal Virus Database: Barley yellow striate mosaic virus
Family Groups - The Baltimore Method

Cytorhabdoviruses
Viral plant pathogens and diseases